Gemini Syndrome is an American alternative metal band formed in 2010 in Los Angeles. The band currently consists of vocalist Aaron Nordstrom, drummer Brian Steele Medina, bassist Alessandro "(AP)" Paveri, and guitarist Miguel "Meegs" Rascon.

History 
The band's debut album, Lux, was released in September 2013. Reviewers drew comparisons to bands like Mudvayne, Five Finger Death Punch, and Tool. Four singles spawned from Lux: "Pleasure and Pain", "Left of Me", "Basement", and "Stardust", which peaked at number 19 on the Mainstream Rock Tracks chart.

Gemini Syndrome released their sophomore album, Memento Mori, on August 16, 2016, which hit number 1 on the Heatseakers Charts. Five singles spawned from Memento Mori: "Eternity", "Anonymous", "Alive Inside", "Sorry Not Sorry", and "Remember We Die", which reached number 24, and spent 20 weeks on the Mainstream Rock Tracks chart.

In a press release on September 13, 2017, the band announced that Miguel "Meegs" Rascón (formerly of Coal Chamber) joined the band, replacing both Daniel Sahagún and Charles Lee Salvaggio.

In August 2018, the group performed throughout the United States with American rock band Messer.

On December 17, 2019, the band released a video announcing a new album and that the first single is expected to be released early in 2020.

On July 23, 2021, the band announced their third album 3rd Degree – The Raising to be released on October 15, 2021. The album features the three previously released singles, "Die with Me", "IDK", and "Reintegration", along with a newly released single "Abandoned".

Members 
Current members
 Aaron Nordstrom – lead vocals 
 Brian Steele Medina – drums 
 Alessandro Paveri – bass 
 Miguel "Meegs" Rascón – guitars 

Former members
 Mike Salerno – guitars, backing vocals 
 Rich Juzwick – guitars, backing vocals 
 Charles Lee Salvaggio – guitars 
 Daniel Sahagún – guitars 
 Nicholas Paul Arnold – guitars, backing vocals

Discography

Studio albums

Singles

Music videos

References

External links 

Hard rock musical groups from California
Heavy metal musical groups from California
American alternative metal musical groups
Musical groups established in 2010
Musical groups from Los Angeles
Another Century Records artists
2010 establishments in California